Rieke Diah Pitaloka Intan Purnamasari or better known as Rieke Diah Pitaloka (born in Garut, West Java, Indonesia on January 8, 1974) is an Indonesian actress, author, and politician of Sundanese descent. She is currently serving as a member of the People's Representative Council from Indonesian Democratic Party of Struggle.

Education
Pitaloka graduated from University of Indonesia with a bachelor's degree in Dutch literature. She also holds another bachelor's degree in philosophy from STF Driyakara. In 2007, she received master's degree in philosophy from University of Indonesia. The thesis she wrote for fulfilling graduate research requirement was published into a book called Kekerasan Negara Menular ke Masyarakat.

References

External links
  Official website

Living people
1974 births
Sundanese people
Indonesian Democratic Party of Struggle politicians
Members of the People's Representative Council, 2009
Members of the People's Representative Council, 2014
Members of the People's Representative Council, 2019